Dany, pseudonym for Daniel Henrotin (born 28 January 1943) is a Belgian comic book artist, best known for Olivier Rameau and Ça vous intéresse?.

Biography
Daniel Henrotin was born in Marche-en-Famenne in 1943. After studying at the Art School of Liège, he started working as a comics artist in 1966, as an assistant for Mitteï, an artist working for Tintin magazine. Dany worked there for a year and then had to leave in order to do his military service.

Afterwards, he started collaborating directly on Tintin magazine with illustrations and short stories, and worked in the studio of Greg, the editor-in-chief of the magazine. Greg wrote a poetic story about Olivier Rameau and the people of Dreamland, and it marked the debut of Dany's first successful and longest running series. Dreamland is very similar to the worlds of L. Frank Baum's Oz and Lewis Carroll's Alice and Dany drew an adaptation of Alice shortly after starting the Olivier Rameau series.

Much of Dany's early work was drawn in a comical style, but in the late 1970s he produced more realistic drawings while in collaboration with writer Jean Van Hamme. This included Histoire sans héros ("Story Without a Hero") in 1977, which was a one-shot adventure story about the survivors of a plane crash trying to find a way out of a dense South American jungle. It obtained critical success and reached a wide audience. Dany and Van Hamme also came up with a series called Arlequin, the adventures of a freelance secret agent and master of disguise made in the spirit of The Persuaders! which was very popular in continental Europe.

Meanwhile, Greg and Dany would collaborate on some other short-lived series, and in the 1990s Greg wrote the final two stories of Bernard Prince for Dany after Hermann had quit the series. (a character based on Prince had featured in one of the Arlequin stories).

But his main commercial success came in 1990 when he started a series of erotic joke comics with Ça vous intéresse?. The series was an instant success, and many artists and writers have collaborated on the books, magazines, and multimedia that have followed since.

Bibliography

Awards
 1971: Prix Saint-Michel, Humour Award, for Olivier Rameau
 2007: Prix Saint-Michel, Best Artwork
 2011: Prix Diagonale

See also
 Red Ears

Sources

 Béra, Michel; Denni, Michel; and Mellot, Philippe (1998): "Trésors de la Bande Dessinée 1999–2000". Paris, Les éditions de l'amateur. 
 Dany publications in Belgian Tintin, French Tintin, Pilote and BoDoï BDoubliées 

Footnotes

External links

Dany official site 
Dany site on Éditions Joker 
Dany biography on Labiek Comiclopedia
Dany biography fan site 

1943 births
Living people
People from Marche-en-Famenne
Belgian comics artists
Belgian comics writers
Belgian erotic artists
Belgian humorists
Belgian illustrators